Wendell Cushing Neville (May 12, 1870 – July 8, 1930) was a major general of the United States Marine Corps. He was a Medal of Honor recipient and 14th Commandant of the Marine Corps between 1929 and 1930.

Military career

Neville was born in Portsmouth, Virginia and later entered the Naval Academy at Annapolis, Maryland, in 1886 chiefly because no one else in his district desired an appointment to Annapolis that year. After graduating in 1890 and following a two-year cruise aboard a warship, which was the practice of the era, was commissioned a Marine Corps second lieutenant.

At the outbreak of the Spanish–American War, 2nd Lt. Neville was assigned to the 1st Battalion, hurriedly organized under Lieutenant Colonel Robert W. Huntington for service in Cuba. The battalion staged a daring attack under heavy gunfire at Guantanamo Bay, established a beachhead and routed enemy forces in that area. For outstanding valor and leadership in that action, Lt. Neville was brevetted a captain in the Marine Corps on June 13, 1898. He was later awarded the Brevet Medal, following its creation in 1921.

Promoted to the permanent rank of captain a few months after the war, Neville was assigned to a battalion of Marines ordered to China to relieve the hard-pressed garrison at Peking during the Boxer Rebellion. He took part in four battles in that area and was again commended for his gallantry.

In the Philippine Islands not long afterwards, he was appointed military governor of Basilan Province. Following that assignment he served in Cuba, Nicaragua, Panama and Hawaii.

During the United States occupation of Veracruz, he was in command of the 2nd Advance Base Regiment. While in command of Marines landing at Veracruz, Mexico, on April 21, 1914, he displayed conspicuous gallantry.  Lieutenant Colonel Neville was awarded the Medal of Honor for his distinguished conduct during the Vera Cruz intervention.  He, Major General Smedley D. Butler and Major General David Dixon Porter were the only individuals to be awarded both the Medal of Honor and the Brevet Medal.

In 1915, Neville returned to China where he was chosen to command the combined Allied guard at Peking, serving in that position until 1917. He was promoted to colonel in August 1916.

On January 1, 1918, almost nine months after the American entry into World War I, he was placed in command of the 5th Marine Regiment in France, succeeding Hiram I. Bearss. The 5th Marines, together with the 6th Marine Regiment, formed part of the 4th Marine Brigade. In May he moved his regiment into action at Belleau Wood where Germany's big drive was decisively halted. In July, after handing over the 5th Marines to Logan Feland, Neville's command was enlarged to include the 4th Marine Brigade, taking over from James Harbord, which he directed during the remaining days of the war and during its occupation service in Germany. He was promoted to brigadier general in 1919.

After service with the Army of Occupation in Germany, Brig. Gen. Neville and his brigade returned to the United States in July 1919. Promoted to major general in August 1920, he served as assistant to the commandant of the Marine Corps and later became commanding general, Fleet Marine Force with headquarters in San Francisco. He also commanded the Marine Barracks, Quantico, Virginia.

Maj. Gen. Neville succeeded Maj. Gen. John A. Lejeune as Commandant of the Marine Corps on March 5, 1929.  Maj. Gen. Neville's sudden death on July 8, 1930, at Edgewater Beach, Maryland, while in office as commandant, closed one of the most brilliant military careers of his day. General Butler lamented the death of "my dear old friend," labeling Lejeune, Neville, and himself "the three musketeers of the Marines."

He was buried at Arlington National Cemetery, in Arlington, Virginia.

Awards and honors
During the 38 years he spent as a U.S. Marine, Major General Neville received five citations, as well as: 
 

, a  United States Navy transport, is named in honor of Major General Neville.

Medal of Honor citation
NEVILLE, Wendell Cushing
Lieutenant Colonel, U.S. Marine Corps
G.O. Navy Department, No. 177
December 4, 1915

Citation:

For distinguished conduct in battle engagements of Vera Cruz 21 and April 22, 1914. In command of the Second Regiment Marines, Lieutenant Colonel Neville was in both days' fighting and almost continually under fire from soon after landing, about noon on the 21st, until we were in possession of the city, about noon of the 22d. His duties required him to be at points of great danger in directing his officers and men, and he exhibited conspicuous courage, coolness and skill in his conduct of the fighting. Upon his courage and skill depended, in great measure, success or failure. His responsibilities were great and he met them in a manner worthy of commendation.

See also

List of Medal of Honor recipients (Veracruz)

References

1870 births
1930 deaths
United States Marine Corps personnel of World War I
American military personnel of the Banana Wars
American military personnel of the Boxer Rebellion
Burials at Arlington National Cemetery
Recipients of the Croix de Guerre 1914–1918 (France)
United States Marine Corps Medal of Honor recipients
Recipients of the Distinguished Service Medal (US Army)
United States Marine Corps Commandants
United States Naval Academy alumni
United States Marine Corps generals
American military personnel of the Spanish–American War
Grand Croix of the Légion d'honneur
People from Portsmouth, Virginia
Recipients of the Navy Distinguished Service Medal
Battle of Veracruz (1914) recipients of the Medal of Honor